Wolfgang Jansen (1938–1988) was a German actor.

Selected filmography
 The Sinful Border (1951)
 The Chaste Libertine (1952)
 Fight of the Tertia (1952)
 Turtledove General Delivery (1952)
 Hit Parade (1953)
 The Cousin from Nowhere (1953)
 Dutch Girl (1953)
 Love, Summer and Music (1956)
 Her Corporal (1956)
 Love (1956)
 Dort in der Wachau (1957)
 Candidates for Marriage (1958)
 The Street (1958)
 The Poacher of the Silver Wood (1957)
 I'm Marrying the Director (1960)
 The Model Boy (1963)
 Our Crazy Aunts in the South Seas (1964)
 The Heathens of Kummerow (1967)
 The Secret of Santa Vittoria (1969)

External links
 

1938 births
1988 deaths
German male film actors
Male actors from Gdańsk
Naturalized citizens of Germany
People from the Free City of Danzig
20th-century German male actors